is a Japanese singer songwriter who released singles and albums between 2000 and 2008. A piano book featuring her work has also been released.

History 
 Aichi Prefectural High School in Meiwa: Graduated in music
 November 23, 2000, released first mini-album Thank (礼)
 2005, joins BabeStar label.
 April 30, 2008, suddenly declares that she will "withdraw from the industry".
 June 4, 2008, her last album  is released.
 June 28, 2008, starts six city nationwide tour.
 July 20, 2008, tour ends at Tokyo Kinema Club.
 July 31, 2008, Official website closes down.

Discography 
 Rei (2000)
 Omoutsubo (2001)
 Fujin'Yo (2002)
 Modern Girl (2003)
 Tokyo Piano (2004)
 Taidaima (2005)
 Ochugen (2006)
 Iroiro (2007)
 Dismantling Piano (2008)

References

External links
BabeStar label artist profile
Yoeko Kurahashi Interview (Japanese)
Enak Long Interview (Japanese)
English translation of the song "Doll"

1976 births
Living people
Japanese songwriters
Musicians from Aichi Prefecture
21st-century Japanese singers
21st-century Japanese women singers